The Democratic Nursing Organisation of South Africa is a trade union in South Africa that describes itself as "a voluntary organisation for South African nurses and midwifery professionals".

It was established in its current form on 5 December 1996.

It is an affiliate of the Congress of South African Trade Unions and became a full member of the International Council of Nurses on 15 June 1997. The union suspended its participation in the leadership structures of the congress on 10 November 2014 as a result of the federations expulsion of the National Union of Metalworkers of South Africa on 7 November 2014.

At its 2010 congress, the organisation passed a resolution that the National Executive Committee should proceed with the merger with the South African Democratic Nurses' Union.

It has set up numerous projects with the aim of improving healthcare in South Africa. These mainly consist of workshops to educate nurses on HIV/AIDS and multi-drug-resistant tuberculosis

Leadership 
The following list is of the national leadership:
 President: Simon Hlungwani
 1st Deputy President: Letsatsi Modise
 2nd Deputy President: Thandeka Msibi
 National Treasurer: Cookie Nkambule
 General Secretary: Thembeka Gwagwa
 Second Deputy General Secretary: Operations David Makhombe
 Second Deputy General Secretary: Member-Service Madithapo Masemola

The following list is of the Provincial Chairpersons.
 Eastern Cape: Lulekwa Nhlebi
 Free State: Thibogang Thole
 Gauteng: Simphiwe Gada
 KwaZulu-Natal: Sibonelo Cele
 Limpopo: Alfred Mpoo Makoana
 Mpumalanga: Mzwandile Shongwe
 North West: Fina Regina Setshedi
 Northern Cape: Martin Taolo
 Western Cape: Barbara Ruiters

References

External links
 

Congress of South African Trade Unions
Nursing organisations in South Africa
International Council of Nurses
Healthcare trade unions in South Africa